Darya Igorevna Astakhova (born 26 January 2002) is a Russian tennis player.

Astakhova has a career-high singles ranking by the Women's Tennis Association (WTA) of 196, and a best WTA doubles ranking of 137, both achieved on 16 January 2023.

Astakhova won her first WTA 125 title at the 2022 Iași Open, in the doubles draw, partnering Andreea Roșca.

Grand Slam performance timeline

Singles

WTA 125 tournament finals

Doubles: 1 (title)

ITF finals

Singles: 13 (5 titles, 8 runner-ups)

Doubles: 15 (6 titles, 9 runner-ups)

References

External links
 
 

2002 births
Living people
Russian female tennis players